A Bedfull of Foreigners (or A Bedful of Foreigners) is a British farce written by Dave Freeman and first performed in the West End in 1973. It is about two couples on holiday in France who are accidentally assigned to the same hotel room.

The play has also been presented internationally, in November 2006, in Singapore and Kuala Lumpur, by the British Theatre Playhouse.

Text
 Dave Freeman, A Bedfull of Foreigners: A Comedy, New York https://books.google.com/books?id=h1IWNAAACAAJ

References

 Eric Johns, British Theatre Review, Vance-Offord (Publications) Ltd., 1974, p. 89

1973 plays
British plays
Comedy plays